Permira is a global investment firm. Founded in 1985, the firm advises funds with assets under management of €60+ billion. The Permira funds have made approximately 300 private equity investments in four key sectors: Technology, Consumer, Services and Healthcare. Permira employs over 360 people in 16 offices across North America, Europe and Asia.

History
Permira was founded in 1985 by Nicholas Ferguson as a number of country-specific separate businesses operating under the Schroder Ventures brand. In 1996, the United Kingdom, French, German and Italian teams joined to create Schroder Ventures Europe and in 1997, this raised its first pan-European fund. In 2001, the firm was renamed Permira.

In 2002, Permira expanded into the U.S. with the opening of its New York office.

In 2005, Permira launched its first Asia Pacific-based office in Japan. It later opened its Hong Kong office in 2008.

In 2006, Permira raised over €10 billion in commitments for its P4 fund, which was, at the time, Europe's largest buyout fund.

In 2007, Permira launched Permira Debt Managers, now Permira Credit, a debt management and advisory business based in London, United Kingdom. The firm advises investment funds and products that provide loans, debt, buyout and acquisition financing solutions to medium-sized European businesses.

In 2008, Permira continued its U.S. expansion with the opening of its  Menlo Park, CA office, which focuses predominantly on technology investments.

In 2014, Permira raised €5.3 billion for its fifth buyout fund, P5.

In 2019, Permira closed its first Growth Opportunities Fund, which makes minority equity investments in high-growth technology and digital businesses, at $1.7 billion. Later that year, Permira closed its seventh buyout fund, P7, at €11 billion.

In 2021, Permira closed its second Growth Opportunities Fund at $4 billion.

Recent acquisitions
2022 – Investment in GoCardless
2022 – Investment in GWI
2022 – Acquisition of Kedrion Biopharma and Bio Products Laboratory
2021 – Investment in Sysdig
2021 – Acquisition of Mimecast 
2021 – Investment in AllTrails 
2021 – Acquisition of McAfee
2021 – Investment in Motus 
2021 – Investment in mParticle
2021 – Investment in Mirakl 
2021 – Acquisition of Engel & Völkers
2021 – Investment in Click and Boat 
2021 – Investment in FullStory 
2021 – Investment in Adevinta 
2021 – Investment in G2
2021 – Investment in New Immo Group 
2021 – Investment in Nexthink
2020 – Acquisition of Boats Group 
2020 – Investment in Catawiki 
2020 – Investment in Full Truck Alliance 
2020 – Acquisition of Clearwater Analytics 
2020 – Acquisition of Seismic 
2020 – Acquisition of Neuraxpharm 
2020 – Investment in Zwift 
2020 – Acquisition of EF 
2020 – Acquisition of Golden Goose 
2020 – Investment in Duff & Phelps 
2020 – Investment in Lytx

References

External links

 
British companies established in 1985
Private equity firms of the United Kingdom
Permira companies